Friendly Fa$cism is a full-length album by industrial/hip hop artists Consolidated, released in 1991.

"Brutal Equation" and "Unity of Oppression" were alternative rock hits on MTV. The album peaked at #6 on the CMJ Radio Top 150.

The name comes from Friendly Fascism: The New Face of Power in America, the title of a 1980 book by political scientist Bertram Gross which lays out the form of "creeping fascism" that Gross feared might come to pass in the United States.

Critical reception
Trouser Press wrote that "the insufferably self-righteous tone makes the disc hard to endure." Alternative Rock called the album "a hard-hitting soundtrack of hip-hop, funk, soul, and hard rock.

Track listing (CD)
 "Zero"  – 0:21
 "Brutal Equation"  – 4:13
 "Our Leader"  – 1:01
 "Unity Of Oppression"  – 4:01
 "The Sexual Politics Of Meat"  – 3:43
 "Typical Male"  – 5:18
 "Entertainment Tonight"  – 0:40
 "Dominion"  – 4:04
 "Friendly Fascism"  – 5:01
 "College Radio"  – 1:27
 "We Gotta Have Peace"  – 3:30
 "Meat Kills"  – 3:34
 "Stoned"  – 6:54
 "Your Body Belongs To The State"  – 1:49
 "Crusading Rap Guys"  – 5:29
 "Murder One"  – 2:52
 "White American Male '91 (The Truth Hurts) Part 2"  – 5:12
 "Music Has No Meaning"  – 5:17

Track listing (Vinyl)
Side One
 "Zero"  – 0:21
 "Brutal Equation"  – 4:13
 "Our Leader"  – 1:01
 "Unity Of Oppression"  – 4:01
 "The Sexual Politics Of Meat"  – 3:43
 "Typical Male"  – 5:18
 "Entertainment Tonight"  – 0:40
 "Friendly Fascism"  – 5:01
Side Two
 "We Gotta Have Peace"  – 3:30
 "Meat Kills"  – 3:34
 "Stoned"  – 6:54
 "White American Male '91 (The Truth Hurts) Part 2"  – 5:12
 "Music Has No Meaning"  – 5:17

References

1991 albums
Consolidated (band) albums
Anti-fascist music